Jeffrey P. Townsend is an American biostatistician and evolutionary biologist. He is currently the Elihu Professor of Biostatistics and Professor of Ecology and Evolutionary Biology at the Yale School of Public Health at Yale University.

Townsend earned a Bachelor of Science in biology from Brown University in 1994. He completed his Ph.D. in organismic and evolutionary biology at Harvard University in 2002 under the direction of Daniel Hartl. After receiving his doctoral degree, Townsend was a Miller Research Fellow at the University of California, Berkeley, where he worked in the lab of John W. Taylor.

References

Related links 

 

Year of birth missing (living people)
Biostatisticians
Evolutionary biologists
American biologists
Brown University alumni
Harvard University alumni
Yale University faculty
Living people